This is a list of all known passenger chassis and integral bus vehicles manufactured by Leyland Motors and Leyland Bus from 1919 until closure.

1919 - 1925

 A1, A5, A7, A9, A11, A13 - 1920-1926
 B - 1919-1920
 C, C1, C5, C7, C9 - 1919-1926
 D - 1920-1924
 E - 1919-1920
 F - 1919
 G, G1, G2, G3, G4, G5, G6, G7, G8 - 1919-1924
 H - 1919-1920
 J - 1919-1920
 K - 1919
 L - 1919-1920
 M, M1 - 1919-1921
 N - 1919-1921
 O, O1 - 1919-1921
 RAF - 1919-1925
 SG2, SG4, SG6, SG7, SG9, SG11 - 1923-1926
 GH2, GH4, GH5, GH7, GH8 - 1923-1926
 OP2 - 1921-1924
 OH2 - 1923-1926
 LB2, LB4, LB5 - 1922-1926
 Z3, Z4, Z5, Z6, Z7 - 1923-1926

1925 - 1942

 Leviathan - 1925-1927
 Lion LSC1, LSC3 - 1925-1931
 Leopard (PLSC2) - 1926
 Leveret - 1926-1928
 Lioness - 1926-1934
 Lion (LT series) - 1929-1940
 Titan (front-engined, TD series) - 1927-1942, unfrozen only after 1940
 Titanic - 1927-1931
 Tiger (front-engined, TS series) - 1927-1942, unfrozen only after 1940
 Tigress - 1934-1939
 Badger - 1930-1936
 Cub - 1931-1938
 Cheetah - 1935-1940
 Gnu - 1937-1939
 Tiger FEC (underfloor engine) - London Transport TF Class - 1939
 REC Cub (rear engine) - London Transport CR Class - 1939
 Panda - 1940

Most chassis with names beginning with the letter L had four-cylinder engines; those beginning with the letter T had six-cylinder engines. There was a Tiger model (built in small numbers) with a four-cylinder engine

1945 - closure

Articulated
 Leyland-DAB articulated bus 1980-?

Double deck
 Titan (front-engined, PD series) - 1945-1970
 Lowlander - 1961-1966
 Atlantean - 1956-1986
 Fleetline - 1973-1980, from Daimler
 Titan (B15) - 1974-1984
 Victory Mark 2 - 1978-1981, built at Guy factory at Wolverhampton
 Olympian - 1979-1993
 Lion - 1986-1988

Single deck

 Tiger (front-engined, PS series) - 1948-1968
 Comet - 1948-1971
 Olympic - 1949-1971
 Royal Tiger - 1950-1955
  Worldmaster - 1955-1979
 Tiger Cub - 1952-1969
 Olympian - 1953-1958
 Leopard - 1959-1982
 Lion - 1960-1965
 Royal Tiger Cub - 1960-1968
 Panther - 1964-1972
 Panther Cub - 1964-1968
 National/National 2 - 1969-1985
 Cub - 1979-1987
 Tiger (mid-engined) - 1979-1992
 B21 - 1975-1983
 Super Viking - 1980-1984
 Royal Tiger (B50/B54) - 1982-1987
 Lynx - 1984-1992
 Swift - 1987-1991

See also

List of buses
Leyland Motors
Leyland Bus

Leyland Buses

Leyland Buses